Marc Gené i Guerrero (born 29 March 1974) is a Spanish professional racing driver. He is best known as a tester for Williams and Ferrari in Formula One, Minardi Formula One driver and factory driver for Peugeot's Le Mans team, with which he won the 2009 24 Hours of Le Mans. His brother Jordi is also a racing driver, competing in the WTCC for SEAT. He had 36 starts in Formula One, mostly through two seasons with the Minardi team, with which he scored a sixth-place finish at the attrition-filled 1999 European Grand Prix.

Starting from the 2010 season, Gené commented on Formula One races for Spanish television on Antena 3. In 2013 he became an expert analyst for Sky Sport F1 HD in Italy. He also remains with Ferrari as their brand ambassador.

Early years
Born in Sabadell, Gené finished runner-up in the 1987 Catalan Kart Championship (National Class) at the age of 13; he would win both this and the National Class Spanish Kart Championship in 1988. In 1989 he competed in both the European and World championships. Gené won the Senior Class of the 1990 Spanish Kart Championship, making him the youngest driver to do so. He competed again in the World Championship in 1991, placing 13th.

For 1992 Gené moved into Formula Ford, placing fifth in the Spanish championship with a win and two pole positions. He was runner-up in the 1993 European Championship, with one win and three podiums; also, Gené took second place at the Formula Ford World Cup and Festival. In 1994, Gené was named Rookie of the Year in the British Formula 3 Championship; he placed 10th in 1995. In 1996 Gené won the FISA Superformula championship, and in 1997 he competed in six rounds of the FIA Formula 3000 series, though he failed to score a point. In 1998 he won the Open Fortuna by Nissan Championship with six wins and three poles.

Formula One
Gené got his big break in 1999, occupying a race seat with the Minardi team. It was a difficult year; however, after several ninth places and an eighth, he managed to score his first point, and Minardi's first since 1995, with a sixth place at the European Grand Prix, while his team-mate Luca Badoer broke down in tears after his car's gearbox failed and denied the Italian his first points finish in Formula One, as he was running in fourth place with 13 laps to go. Gené continued with Minardi in 2000, but failed to score a single point, with his best finish being eighth at the Australian and Austrian Grands Prix. His team-mate in 2000 was Argentina's Gastón Mazzacane, who also achieved a best finish of eighth, at the European Grand Prix.

Testing
Unable to obtain a quality drive for 2001, Gené opted to sign with Williams as test driver. He drove three Grands Prix for the team as temporary substitute. The first of these was the 2003 Italian Grand Prix, where Ralf Schumacher was unable to race because of a concussion. Gené replaced his teammate well, collecting four points for a fifth-place finish, but Schumacher was back in the car for the next race in the USA. Following a back injury to Schumacher at the 2004 USGP, Gené drove in the French and British Grands Prix, but subsequently lost the race seat to Antônio Pizzonia and did not race again in F1.

In November 2004, Gené signed a deal to become a test driver for Scuderia Ferrari alongside former teammate Luca Badoer. A limit on testing in Formula One in 2007 and 2008 had restricted his involvement.

At the end of 2010, Gené along with Badoer and Giancarlo Fisichella was replaced by Jules Bianchi as Ferrari test driver ahead of the 2011 season.

Sportscar racing

Gené has also been hired by Peugeot as a factory driver for their 908 HDi FAP Le Mans Series effort, as well as the 24 Hours of Le Mans since 2007.  In 2008, Gené crashed his 908 heavily in practice for the 2008 24 Hours of Le Mans, but escaped with a broken toe. A year later, however, there were no such problems, and the Peugeot he shared with David Brabham and Alex Wurz completed 382 laps on its way to victory in the 2009 24 Hours of Le Mans. He completed the last stint for the team and brought the 908 home to a standing ovation from the avid French crowd, who saw one of their cars stop the recent domination of Audi in the prestigious event.

In both 2008 and 2009 he also took part in the 1000 km Spa endurance race, winning in 2008 and finishing 12th in 2009.

Career Statistics (as of 2004 British Grand Prix)
 Grands Prix started: 36
 Points: 5
 Best Championship position: 17th (2003)
 Most points in one season: 4 (2003)
 Best race classification: 5th (2003 Italian Grand Prix)
 Best grid position: 5th (2003 Italian Grand Prix)

Racing record

Complete International Formula 3000 results
(key) (Races in bold indicate pole position) (Races in italics indicate fastest lap)

Complete Formula One results
(key)

24 Hours of Le Mans results

Complete Le Mans Series results

Complete FIA World Endurance Championship results

References

External links

 
 

1974 births
Living people
Sportspeople from Sabadell
Catalan racing drivers
Karting World Championship drivers
Formula Ford drivers
British Formula Three Championship drivers
International Formula 3000 drivers
Spanish Formula One drivers
Catalan Formula One drivers
Minardi Formula One drivers
Williams Formula One drivers
24 Hours of Le Mans drivers
24 Hours of Le Mans winning drivers
American Le Mans Series drivers
European Le Mans Series drivers
FIA World Endurance Championship drivers
Formula One journalists and reporters
12 Hours of Sebring drivers
Peugeot Sport drivers
Audi Sport drivers
Team Joest drivers
Nordic Racing drivers
Alan Docking Racing drivers
Campos Racing drivers